The Democratic Republic of the Congo competed at the 2020 Summer Olympics in Tokyo. Originally scheduled to take place from 24 July to 9 August 2020, the Games were postponed to 23 July to 8 August 2021, because of the COVID-19 pandemic. It was the nation's eleventh consecutive appearance at the Summer Olympics, although it had previously competed in four editions under the name Zaire.

Competitors
The following is the list of number of competitors in the Games.

Athletics

Democratic Republic of the Congo received a universality slot from the World Athletics to send a male athlete to the Olympics.

Track & road events

Boxing 

The Democratic Republic of the Congo entered four boxers (two per gender) into the Olympic tournament for the first time since London 2012. David Tshama scored an outright semifinal victory to secure a spot in the men's middleweight division at the 2020 African Qualification Tournament in Diamniadio, Senegal. 

Fiston Mbaya Mulumba (men's lightweight), Marcelat Sakobi Matshu (women's featherweight), and Naomie Yumba Therese (women's lightweight) completed the nation's boxing lineup by topping the list of eligible boxers from Africa in their respective weight divisions of the IOC's Boxing Task Force Rankings.

Judo

Democratic Republic of the Congo qualified one judoka for the women's half-heavyweight category (78 kg) at the Games. Marie Branser accepted a continental berth from Africa as the nation's top-ranked judoka outside of direct qualifying position in the IJF World Ranking List of June 28, 2021.

Taekwondo
 
Democratic Republic of the Congo received an invitation from the Tripartite Commission and the World Taekwondo Federation to send Naomie Katoka in the women's welterweight category (67 kg) to the Olympics.

References

Nations at the 2020 Summer Olympics
2020
2021 in the Democratic Republic of the Congo sport